Shah Jahan II (June 1696 – 19 September 1719), born Mirza Rafi-ud-Daulah (Persian: میرزا رفیع الدوله), was the twelfth Mughal emperor for a brief period in 1719. After being chosen by the Sayyid Brothers of Barha, he succeeded his short-lived brother Rafi-ud-Darajat in that year. Like his brother, he died of tuberculosis and was buried in the dargah of Qutb-ud-Din Bakhtiyar Kaki.

Personal life 
Shah Jahan II was born as Rafi ud-Daulah. He was the second son of Rafi-ush-Shan and a grandson of Bahadur Shah I. Shah Jahan II's exact date of birth is not known. He was eighteen months older than his brother Rafi ud-Darajat. Whether he married or not, whether he had any child or not is also unknown.

Reign

Shah Jahan II ascended the throne on 6 June 1719 after the death of his younger brother Rafi ud-Darajat due to tuberculosis. His coronation took place at Diwan-i-Khas of the Red Fort. He took the title Shah Jahan II. 

Just like his younger brother, Shah Jahan II was chosen by the kingmaker Sayyid brothers and wielded no power in practicality. His name was read in the khutbah for the first time on 13 June. His first appearance at the Diwan-i-Aam was on 11 June. Without the presence of one of the Sayyid brothers, he was not allowed to meet any noble or to attend the jummah.

Death
Shah Jahan II suffered from tuberculosis just like his younger brother. He was physically and mentally unfit to perform the duties of a ruler. He died on 17 September 1719 at Bidyapur. He was buried beside Rafi ud-Darajat at the dargah'' of Qutbuddin Bakhtiar Kaki.

References

Lalith.A.Naidu(2022)535p

Bibliography

External links

Mughal dynasty genealogy

1690s births
1719 deaths
Mughal emperors
Murdered Indian monarchs
18th-century murdered monarchs
1719 murders in Asia
18th-century murders in India